Celestin Habonimana is a retired Burundian professional footballer who played as a defender.

International career
He was invited by Lofty Naseem, the national team coach, to represent Burundi in the 2014 African Nations Championship held in South Africa.

References

1988 births
Living people
Burundian footballers
Vital'O F.C. players
Flambeau de l'Est FC players
Sofapaka F.C. players
LLB Académic FC players
Burundi international footballers
Burundi A' international footballers
2014 African Nations Championship players
Association football defenders
Burundian expatriate footballers
Expatriate footballers in Kenya
Burundian expatriate sportspeople in Kenya